Arthur Gore (1891–1969) was an Australian rugby league footballer who played in the 1920s for St. George.

A local junior from the Arncliffe Waratahs, Gore was graded in 1922 and played two seasons during the foundation years of the St. George. He was a handy hooker who held his position in the team until his retirement in 1923, age 32.

Gore died on 15 April 1969 at Kogarah, New South Wales.

References

St. George Dragons players
Australian rugby league players
Rugby league players from Sydney
Rugby league hookers
1891 births
1969 deaths